Kuhberg may refer to the following mountains in Germany:

 Kuhberg (Dürrhennersdorf)
 Kuhberg (Stützengrün)